Vadim Viktorovich Sosulin (born 18 March 1963 in Barnaul) is a former Russian football player.

References

1963 births
Sportspeople from Barnaul
Living people
Soviet footballers
FC Dynamo Barnaul players
Russian footballers
FC Fakel Voronezh players
Russian Premier League players
Russian expatriate footballers
Expatriate footballers in Germany
Association football defenders